Bolling v. Sharpe, 347 U.S. 497 (1954), is a landmark United States Supreme Court case in which the Court held that the Constitution prohibits segregated public schools in the District of Columbia. Originally argued on December 10–11, 1952, a year before Brown v. Board of Education, Bolling was reargued on December 8–9, 1953, and was unanimously decided on May 17, 1954, the same day as Brown. The Bolling decision was supplemented in 1955 with the second Brown opinion, which ordered desegregation "with all deliberate speed". In Bolling, the Court did not address school desegregation in the context of the Fourteenth Amendment's Equal Protection Clause, which applies only to the states, but rather held that school segregation was unconstitutional under the Due Process Clause of the Fifth Amendment to the United States Constitution. The Court observed that the Fifth Amendment to the United States Constitution lacked an Equal Protection Clause, as in the Fourteenth Amendment to the United States Constitution. However, the Court held that the concepts of equal protection and due process are not mutually exclusive, establishing the reverse incorporation doctrine.

Background
Beginning in late 1941, a group of parents from the Anacostia neighborhood of Washington, D.C., calling themselves the Consolidated Parents Group, petitioned the Board of Education of the District of Columbia to open the nearly-completed John Philip Sousa Junior High as an integrated school. The school board denied the petition and the school opened, admitting only whites. On September 11, 1950, Gardner Bishop, Nicholas Stabile and the Consolidated Parents Group attempted to get eleven African-American students (including the case's plaintiff, Spottswood Bolling) admitted to the school, but were refused entry by the school's principal.

James Nabrit Jr., a professor of law at Howard University School of Law, a historically black university, filed suit in 1951 on behalf of Bolling and the other students in the District Court for the District of Columbia seeking assistance in the students' admission. After the court dismissed the claim, the case was granted a writ of certiorari by the Supreme Court in 1952. Howard law professor George E. C. Hayes worked with Nabrit on the oral argument for the Supreme Court hearing. While Nabrit's argument in Bolling rested on the unconstitutionality of segregation, the much more famous Brown v. Board of Education (decided on the same day) argued that the idea of 'separate but equal' facilities sanctioned by Plessy v. Ferguson, 163 U.S. 537 (1896) was a fallacy as the facilities for black students were woefully inadequate.

Decision
The Court, led by newly confirmed Chief Justice Earl Warren, decided unanimously in favor of the plaintiffs. In his opinion, Justice Warren noted that while the 14th Amendment, whose Equal Protection Clause was cited in Brown in order to declare segregation unconstitutional, does not apply in the District of Columbia, the Fifth Amendment did apply. While the Fifth Amendment lacks an equal protection clause, Warren held that "the concepts of equal protection and due process, both stemming from our American ideal of fairness, are not mutually exclusive." While equal protection is a more explicit safeguard against discrimination, the Court stated that "discrimination may be so unjustifiable as to be violative of due process." Referring to the technicalities raised by the case's location in the District of Columbia, the Court held that, in light of their decision in Brown that segregation in state public schools is prohibited by the Constitution, it would be "unthinkable that the same Constitution would impose a lesser duty on the Federal Government".

The Court concluded: "racial segregation in the public schools of the District of Columbia is a denial of the due process of law guaranteed by the 5th Amendment".  The Court restored both Bolling and Brown to the docket until they could reconvene to discuss how to effectively implement the decisions.

Controversy
Some scholars have argued that the Court's decision in Bolling should have been reached on other grounds. For example, Judge Michael W. McConnell of the United States Court of Appeals for the Tenth Circuit wrote that Congress never "required that the schools of the District of Columbia be segregated".  According to that rationale, the segregation of schools in Washington D.C. was unauthorized and therefore illegal.

In a debate, law professors Cass Sunstein and Randy Barnett agreed that while the result was desirable, Bolling does not reconcile with the Constitution, with Barnett saying: "You are right to point out that the Supreme Court's decision in Bolling v. Sharpe is very difficult to reconcile with the text of the Constitution. For this reason, you know that among constitutional scholars of all stripes Bolling is one of the most controversial and difficult cases ever decided by the Court."

See also
List of United States Supreme Court cases, volume 347

References

Further reading

External links

African-American history of Washington, D.C.
Civil rights movement case law
United States equal protection case law
United States Supreme Court cases
United States Supreme Court cases of the Warren Court
United States school desegregation case law
1954 in United States case law
Legal history of the District of Columbia
United States due process case law